Ladda quadristriga is a species of butterfly in the family Hesperiidae. It is found in Venezuela, Peru, Bolivia and Ecuador.

Subspecies
Ladda quadristriga quadristriga - Ecuador, Venezuela
Ladda quadristriga regia Evans, 1955 - Peru
Ladda quadristriga rota Evans, 1955 - Bolivia

References

Butterflies described in 1889
Hesperiidae of South America
Taxa named by Paul Mabille